is a Japanese group rhythmic gymnast.

Career 
She represents her nation at international competitions. She competed at several world championships, including at the 2015 World Rhythmic Gymnastics Championships where she won the bronze medal in the 5 ribbons event and eventually competed alongside her teammates Airi Hatakeyama, Sakura Noshitani, Rie Matsubara and Kiko Yokota at the 2016 Summer Olympics in Rio de Janeiro, finishing outside of medals in the group all-around final with an eighth-place score of 34.200.

References

External links
 

1996 births
Living people
Japanese rhythmic gymnasts
People from Nagoya
Sportspeople from Nagoya
Medalists at the Rhythmic Gymnastics World Championships
Gymnasts at the 2020 Summer Olympics
Olympic gymnasts of Japan
21st-century Japanese women